"Time B.O.M.B." (stylised "TIME B.O.M.B.") is a song by French hip hop artist Nekfeu and produced by 90' Box. It was released on December 19, 2014 as a single, and entered the French Singles Chart at number 86 on 27 December 2014, where it has since peaked.

Music video
A music video for the song was released on YouTube on 3 July 2015. Like the song itself, the video is 4 minutes and 38 seconds long and was directed by GVRCH and Clifto Cream.

Track listing
 Digital download
 "Time B.O.M.B." – 4:38

Chart performance

References

2014 singles
2014 songs
Nekfeu songs
French-language songs
Seine Zoo singles
Polydor Records singles
Songs written by Nekfeu